Life Goes to the Movies is a 1976 television documentary about American cinema directed by Mel Stuart.

It stars Shirley MacLaine, Henry Fonda, and Liza Minnelli as hosts.

The title references Life magazine, and covered movies during its run from 1936-72.

References

External links
 

1976 documentary films
1976 films
Documentary films about Hollywood, Los Angeles